Acanthatrium is a genus of flatworms belonging to the family Lecithodendriidae.

The species of this genus are found in Northern America.

Species:
Acanthatrium anoplocami
Acanthatrium atriopapillatum 
Acanthatrium hitaensis 
Acanthatrium macracanthium
Acanthatrium nycteridis 
Acanthatrium oregonense
Acanthatrium ovatum 
Acanthatrium sogandaresi 
Acanthatrium sungi 
Acanthatrium taiwanense 
Acanthatrium tatrense

References

Platyhelminthes